Josef Karl Rädler (1844–1917) was a porcelain painter from Austria, described as “...one of the most exciting self-taught artists to be discovered in recent years.”. Rather than from his work on porcelain, the main recognition he has received as an artist is for roughly 400 watercolour paintings he produced whilst an in-patient at asylums in Austria from 1897 onwards, that were only discovered roughly 50 years after his death.

Early life and illness

Rädler was born in Bohemia. Aged 23, he moved to Vienna. In Vienna he established a porcelain workshop, married and had four children. However, after experiencing severe mood swings in his late 40s, he undertook a number of unrealistic business ventures and court proceedings that cost him greatly, both financially and personally. By 1893 his family reluctantly had him committed to a Viennese asylum at Pilgerhain. There Rädler was diagnosed as suffering from “secondary dementia” (what may be now termed schizophrenia), however it was more recently suggested that his illness could have been latent epilepsy.

Paintings

Whilst confined to the hospital, Rädler started to produce watercolour paintings in 1897. His paintings were meticulous and used both sides of the paper. One side usually being a relatively realistic image, and the other, intricately nested skeins of symbolic figures and text that often taper off into illegible scribbles. Rädler was transferred to a new state-of-the-art sanatorium at Mauer-Öhling in 1905. Here he had access to large, park-like grounds, and an amusement area where patients met for folk festival, dancing, bowling, and similar events. At Mauer-Öhling, the range of Rädler’s subject matter dramatically increased. Having previously painted mainly birds, he now produced portraits of patients taking part in a variety of activities, and landscapes of the grounds surrounding the hospital.

It appears that the patients showing interest in painting were encouraged by hospital staff. Rädler consumed copious amounts of paint and paper, which he used for both painting and writing.

Personality

Rädlers mood could be nasty and belligerent, and when not writing he often harangued fellow patients with lengthy philosophical discourses. He often signed his watercolors “The Laughing Philosopher,” believing himself to be a great thinker and a great artist. He frequently marked his work with exorbitant prices, although was prepared to sell for considerably less, on the condition that a promissory note for the balance was signed by the buyer. This is perhaps evidence of delusional megalomania.

The hospital records, however, do not speak highly of his paintings, saying they were “mannered, wooden, spiritless.” It appears his family shared the view of the hospital staff, despite one of his sons apparently becoming an artist, there is no record of them having shown an interest in his work at the time.

Discovery of his work

Approximately 400 of Rädler's watercolours were discovered in a rubbish heap at Mauer-Öhling in the 1960s, by the husband of one of the nurses. In 1972, this nurse took them to Leo Navratil, the Austrian psychiatrist that had formed the artists’ group at the Gugging Mental Hospital. Navratil acquired roughly 100 of the watercolors, before donating them to the Niederösterreichisches Landesmuseum, where they were exhibited in 1994. The remainder of the drawings were preserved by one of the doctors at Mauer-Öhling, whose estate is now selling them.

In 2009, The Wellcome Collection in London exhibited a small number of his watercolour paintings in an exhibition titled "Madness & Modernity:
Mental illness and the visual arts in Vienna 1900".

Notes

References
Kallir, Jane "Josef Karl Rädler". . The Anthony Petullo Collection of Self-Taught and Outsider Art . Retrieved on 2009-04-20.

Porcelain painters
1844 births
1917 deaths
Austrian male artists